Pelochyta fassli is a moth of the family Erebidae. It was described by Walter Rothschild in 1911. It is found in Colombia.

References

Pelochyta
Moths described in 1911